Pallanchacra District is one of thirteen districts of the province Pasco in Peru.

See also 
 Q'illaywasin

References